The spot-tailed antwren (Herpsilochmus sticturus) is a species of bird in the family Thamnophilidae. It is found in Brazil, Colombia, French Guiana, Guyana, Suriname, and Venezuela. Its natural habitat is subtropical or tropical moist lowland forests.

References

spot-tailed antwren
Birds of the Guianas
spot-tailed antwren
spot-tailed antwren
Taxonomy articles created by Polbot